Xiyang Yi Ethnic Township (Yi script:?) is an ethnic township in Jinning District, Yunnan.

Demographics and Languages
Among its 10,155 residents, 78% (7,921) are ethnic minorities in China, chiefly Yi people (Lolo) and Hani people, as of 2006. Nuosu language, being one of the Lolo-Burmese languages, is most spoken there.

Geography
It has an average annual temperature of 16.8C, annual precipitation of 891.8mm and annual sunshine hours of 2278.5.

References 

Township-level divisions of Kunming
Yi ethnic townships